Dillon Guy (born July 16, 1991) is a Canadian football offensive lineman who is currently a free agent. He played college football at the University at Buffalo and attended Waterdown District High School in Waterdown, Ontario. Guy was drafted with the 30th overall pick in the 2016 CFL Draft by the BC Lions. After being cut by the Lions prior to the start of the 2016 CFL season, Guy spent the 2016, 2017, and part of the 2018 seasons on the practice squads of the Saskatchewan Roughriders, Calgary Stampeders, and Ottawa Redblacks. On October 18, 2018, Guy was signed by the Montreal Alouettes, and on October 20, 2018, Guy made his CFL debut against the Toronto Argonauts.

References

External links
CFL profile
Buffalo Bulls bio

1991 births
BC Lions players
Buffalo Bulls football players
Calgary Stampeders players
Canadian football offensive linemen
Living people
Montreal Alouettes players
Ottawa Redblacks players
Players of Canadian football from Ontario
Saskatchewan Roughriders players
Sportspeople from Hamilton, Ontario